Varmazyar-e Olya (also Romanized as Varmazyār-e ‘Olyā; also known as Varmaziar and Varmazyār) is a village in Qareh Poshtelu-e Pain Rural District, Qareh Poshtelu District, Zanjan County, Zanjan Province, Iran. At the 2006 census, its population was 263, in 49 families.

References 

Populated places in Zanjan County